= Lent, Virginia =

Unincorporated community in Virginia, United States

Coordinates: 38°09′04″N 77°14′34″W

Lent is an unincorporated community in Caroline County, in the U.S. state of Virginia.
